The Roman Catholic Diocese of Myitkyina (Lat: Dioecesis Myitkyinaensis) is a diocese of the Latin Church of the Roman Catholic Church in Burma. Erected in 1939 as the Apostolic Prefecture of Bhamo, the prefecture was created from territory in the Apostolic Vicariate of Northern Burma. In 1961, the Prefecture was elevated to a full diocese, suffragan to the Archdiocese of Mandalay. The current bishop is Francis Daw Tang, appointed in 2004. Currently the Diocese manages numerous churches, schools and clinics throughout Kachin State.

Pre-History
Before the Diocese was fully established, the first footprints of Catholicism in Myitkyina were set in 1856, when French Bishop Paul Bigandet M.E.P. visited the northern region of Burma. Seventeen years later, in 1873, a trio of priests was dispatched to begin the early works of the Diocese. According to internal historical records, three decades of extreme sicknesses caused by malaria brought the work to a stand-still.

Between the years 1873 to 1901, 14 priests either died or returned wrecked in health. The mission was slow to spread throughout Kachin populations in the early 20th century until the arrival of the first Columban Missionaries from Ireland in 1936.

History
With "Divine Providence" re-instated in the architects of Catholicism in Kachin State, evangelization was resumed with "renewed vigour and fresh hopes" and by 1965 and 1966, the diocese was handed over to the local clergy.

Throughout the 1960s and to this day, the Diocese of Myitkyina has been bringing gospel and aid to isolated and hazardous locations in Northern Myanmar.

Ordinaries
Patrizio Usher, S.S.C.M.E. † (7 Jan 1939 Appointed - 1958 Died) 
John James Howe, S.S.C.M.E. † (18 Jul 1959 Appointed - 9 Dec 1976 Resigned) 
Paul Zingtung Grawng (9 Dec 1976 Appointed - 24 May 2003 Appointed, Archbishop of Mandalay) Grawng is credited as being the first Kachin priest to be ordained as a priest in 1965.
Francis Daw Tang (3 Dec 2004 Appointed - 18 Nov 2020 Resigned)

See also
Catholic Church in Burma

References

Myitkyina
Christian organizations established in 1939
Roman Catholic dioceses and prelatures established in the 20th century
1939 establishments in Burma